Kyrros (in classical contexts also transliterated Cyrrhus) is a former municipality in the Pella regional unit, Greece. Since the 2011 local government reform it is part of the municipality Pella, of which it is a municipal unit. The municipal unit has an area of 181.415 km2. Population 6,479 (2011). The seat of the municipality was in Mylotopos. The municipality took its name from the ancient Macedonian town Cyrrhus, which was located near ancient Pella.

References

Bottiaea
Populated places in Pella (regional unit)

bg:Пела (дем)